Bariza Ghezlani otherwise known as Bariza Ghazlani, Bariza Ghezelani or Bariza Ghozlani, (born 16 September 1993) is an Algerian  racewalker. She is a two-tie winner of the Algerian 20 kilometres race walk cup (2014 and 2015) and won two medals at the Arab Athletics Championships.

International competitions

Circuit wins
Grand Prix International de marche: 2013
Open championship of Algeria "Tayeb Mghezzi": 2013
Algerian Race Walking Cup: 2014, 2015

Personal bests
 10 km race walk : 50:41.36 min (2015)

References

External links

1993 births
Living people
Algerian female racewalkers
21st-century Algerian people